Charumai Mahawat (born 10 March 1934) is a Thai former sports shooter. He competed in the 50 metre rifle three positions event at the 1968 Summer Olympics. He also competed at the 1966 Asian Games and won a bronze medal in team event.

References

External links
 

1934 births
Living people
Charumai Mahawat
Charumai Mahawat
Shooters at the 1968 Summer Olympics
Charumai Mahawat
Asian Games medalists in shooting
Shooters at the 1966 Asian Games
Charumai Mahawat
Medalists at the 1966 Asian Games
Charumai Mahawat